Kachalka is a rural locality (a village) in Voskresenskoye Rural Settlement, Cherepovetsky District, Vologda Oblast, Russia. The population was 9 as of 2002.

Geography 
Popovka is the nearest rural locality.

References 

Rural localities in Cherepovetsky District